Ivan Vitalievich Kuliak (Russian: Иван Витальевич Куляк; born 28 February 2002) is a Russian artistic gymnast. He is the 2019 Russian Junior all-around and floor champion and the horizontal bar silver medalist. In March 2022 he gained notoriety for displaying a pro-invasion Z symbol during a medal ceremony, shortly after the beginning of the 2022 Russian invasion of Ukraine.

Career

Kuliak took up gymnastics at age 4 in 2006 in Kaluga, Russia, when his mother enrolled him in gymnastics classes.

In 2019 Kuliak became the Russian Junior all-around and floor champion and the silver medalist on horizontal bar.

He represented Russia at the 2019 European Youth Summer Olympic Festival and won the silver medal in the individual all-around, a bronze on floor and still rings and a silver medal as part of the Russian team. In 2019 he received the title Master of Sports.

2022 World Cup controversy 
In March 2022, Kuliak wore a "Z" sticker on his chest during the medal ceremony of the parallel bars competition at the 2022 FIG Artistic Gymnastics World Cup series in Doha. "Z", a letter which is not part of the Cyrillic alphabet, is a tactical marking used by some Russian invading forces in Ukraine. Thus, it has become a pro-war symbol. Kuliak displayed the symbol while standing on the podium next to a Ukrainian athlete, Illia Kovtun, who won the event. The FIG prior to the competitions decided to exclude Russian athletes from the competitions, but the prohibition only entered in force on 7 March.

On 6 March the FIG announced that they will ask the Gymnastics Ethics Foundation to open disciplinary proceedings against Kuliak. In a subsequent interview, on Tuesday 8 March, Kuliak said that he had no regrets and would "do exactly the same". On 18 March, he appeared at the 2022 Moscow rally wearing an Olympic medal, though he has not competed in the Olympics.

On 17 May the FIG sanctioned Kuliak with a one-year ban, ending May 17, 2023 or six months after the ban on Russian athletes is lifted and ruled that he is to be stripped of his bronze medal and prize money.

On 14 September it was announced that Kuliaks appeal against his suspension was partially upheld. The Gymnastics Ethics Foundation (GEF) Appeal Tribunal found that the one-year sanctions should be independent from measures preventing Russian gymnasts from competing at FIG events. This means his suspension will last until May 16, 2023.

Competitive history

References

External links

 
 
 Ivan Kuliak profile 

Russian gymnasts
Living people
2002 births
Sports controversies
Banned sportspeople
Russian nationalists
Sportspeople from Kaluga